Surma Jahid (born 9 July 1978) is a Bangladeshi liberation war researcher and writer. She has earned almost all major national awards including Bangla Academy Literary Award in 2017, Bangamata Begum Fazilatun Nesa Mujib Award in 2021 and Independence Day Award in 2023.

Awards 

 Bangla Academy Literary Award (2017)
 Bangamata Begum Fazilatun Nesa Mujib Award (2021)
 Anannya Top Ten Award (2016)
 Independence Day Award (2023)

References 

Living people
Bangladeshi writers
Recipients of Bangla Academy Award
Recipients of the Independence Day Award
21st-century Bangladeshi women writers
1978 births